Women made up the majority of the 10,000 people who worked at Bletchley Park. The following is a list of women who worked at Bletchley Park who have Wikipedia articles.

List 
 Helene Aldwinckle
 Margaret Allan (racing driver)
 Ruth Camilla (Billy) Armitage Jones 
 Pamela Ascherson
 Sarah Baring
 Mavis Batey
 Osla Benning
 Susan Elizabeth Black
 Carmen Blacker
 Ruth Bourne
 Jean Briggs Watters
 Audrey Ruth Briggs
 Catherine Caughey
 Christine Brooke-Rose 
 Irene Brown (Irene Young) 
 Joan Clarke
 Rozanne Colchester
 Margaret Cooper
 Dorrit Dekk
 Irene Dixon
 Dorothy Du Boisson
 Diana Elles, Baroness Elles
 Maxime de la Falaise
 Lady Jean Fforde
 Jane Fawcett
 Sigrid Augusta Green
 Jeanne Patricia Greenland
 Gwen Hollington
 Rosalind Hudson
 Dorothy Hyson
 Eleanor Ireland
 Joan Joslin
 Marjorie Kennedy
 Barbara Mauritzen
Ailsa Maxwell (née Macdonald)
 Cicely Mayhew
 Valerie Middleton
 Ann Katharine Mitchell
 Alison Robins
 Margaret O'Connell
 Margaret Rock
 Ione Roseveare
 Miriam Rothschild
 Mair Russell-Jones
 Margot Sandeman
 Mercy Seiradaki
 Joan Stafford-King-Harman
 Rosemary Brown Stanton
 Joy Tamblin
 Joan Thirsk
 Mother Thekla
 Clara Grace Thornton
 Amy Elizabeth Thorpe
 Jean Barker, Baroness Trumpington
 Jean Valentine (bombe operator)
 Betty Webb (code breaker)

See also 
 Women in Bletchley Park
 List of people associated with Bletchley Park

References 

 
Bletchley Park
Bletchley Park women